Alphabet pasta, also referred to as alfabeto and alphabetti spaghetti in the UK, is a pasta that has been mechanically cut or pressed into the letters of the alphabet. It is often served in an alphabet soup, sold in a can of condensed broth. Another variation, Alphagetti, consists of letter-shaped pasta in a marinara or spaghetti sauce.

It is not clear who invented alphabet soup, or when. As early as 1877, Paris grocers sold "...small bits of macaroni, for use in soup, which are stamped with... the letters of the alphabet." and Paris restaurants served "...delicious soups made of macaroni or vermicelli cut up into the shape of letters of the alphabet..."  In 1883, The Chicago Herald Cooking School cookbook provide a recipe for soup calling for a small pasta such as "alphabet pastes of the same material as macaroni stamped in letters". In January 1900 it was on the menu at New York City's Au Lion d'Or. In 1908, Wilbur Wright was served alphabet soup in Le Mans, France.

Also unclear is whether the soup or the linguistic term for an overabundance of acronyms or abbreviations came first; food historian Janet Clarkson notes that "the first reference I have found so far to the metaphorical alphabet soup also occurs in 1883, in a quotation by the originator of Life magazine, John Ames Mitchell, referring to teaching his son the alphabet soup (the ABCs) of business."

One common American brand of condensed-style alphabet soup is the Campbell's brand. This soup, like its competitors, is marketed towards parents for its educational value.

A similar product, Alphabetti Spaghetti, was sold by the H. J. Heinz Company for 60 years before being discontinued in 1990. Like Campbell's alphabet soup, it contains alphabet pasta canned in tomato sauce. It was later reintroduced by Heinz in 2005.

See also
Alpha-Bits
 List of pasta
 List of pasta dishes
 SpaghettiOs

References

External links
 Pasta-shapes - an illustrated guide at Food-Info.net
 Alphabet Soup is 150 Years Old - This Is How We Started Spelling With Our Food at Trivia Happy

Types of pasta